The Jotham Woodruff House is a historic house at 11 Alyssa Court in Southington, Connecticut.  Probably built about 1790, it is a good local example of late Georgian architecture with later Greek Revival alterations.  It was listed on the National Register of Historic Places in 1989.

Description and history
The Jotham Woodruff House stands in what is now a suburban residential area east of downtown Southington, on the south side of Woodruff Street at its junction with Alyssa Court.  It is a -story wood-frame structure, with a gabled roof, central chimney, and clapboarded exterior.  The gable ends have broad fascia boards and returns that are a 19th-century modification. Its main facade is five bays wide, with a center entrance flanked by sidelight windows and pilasters, and topped by a broad corniced entablature.  A single-story shed-roof bay projects to the left side, and a single-story gabled ell extends to the rear, joining the main block to a 20th-century garage.

The house as traditionally been ascribed a construction date of about 1730, but stylistic evidence suggests a later date.  It was probably built around 1790 by Jotham Woodruff, a member of one of Southington's founding families, who married in 1793.  The entrance surround and the gable returns, added in the mid-19th century, are Greek Revival alterations.

See also
National Register of Historic Places listings in Southington, Connecticut

References

Houses on the National Register of Historic Places in Connecticut
Colonial architecture in the United States
Houses completed in 1790
Houses in Southington, Connecticut
National Register of Historic Places in Hartford County, Connecticut